is a Japanese rock band from Fukuoka, Japan signed under Universal Sigma. The band's members consist of Shizuku (guitar and vocals), Harushi Ejima (guitar), Yuki Uemura (bass), and Kazuma Mitsuyasu (drums).

History

2014–2016: Indies era, Honenuki EP
In April 2014, vocalist and guitarist Shizuku, guitarist Muro, and drummer Kazuma Mitsuyasu founded the band and later scouted Yuki Uemura as their bassist in November. On April 29, 2015, they released , their first single. Shortly before the release of their second single, Muro departed from the band, and Harushi Ejima was scouted as the band's newest guitarist.

By September, the music video had gained 1 million likes. This was then followed up by the release of their first extended play, on November 9, 2016.

2017–present: Major label debut, Zenchizennō
In 2017, Polkadot Stingray released their first major-label extended play, on April 26, with the leading track, . The extended play was recorded with Hiromi Hirohiro from Tricot and Igarashi from Hitorie on bass due to Uemura injuring his arm. In July, they went on their first nationwide tour, stopping at six cities. On November 8, 2017, they released their first studio album, . To promote the album, they embarked on their second nationwide tour in 2018.

In February 2018, Polkadot Stingray announced that they were releasing the extended play  in May, with its leading track, "Ichidaiji", as the theme song to the live-action film adaptation of Missions of Love. In September 2018, Polkadot Stingray announced that the song  will be the theme song for the film Smartphone wo Otoshita Dake nano ni.

Polkadot Stingray performed the ending theme to the anime series Radiant with the song "Radiant."

Polkadot Stingray performed the ending theme to the anime Godzilla Singular Point with the song .

Members

Current

  – vocals and guitar (2014–present)
  – drums (2014–present)
  – bass (2014–present)
  – guitar (2015–present)

Former

  – guitar (2014–2015)

Discography

Albums

Extended plays

Indies

Major

Singles

Indies

Major

Tours

References

External links
 
 Polkadot Stingray at Oricon 

Japanese rock music groups
Musical groups established in 2015
Musical quartets
Musical groups from Fukuoka Prefecture
2015 establishments in Japan
Female-fronted musical groups